Dudley Stagpoole,  (1838 – 1 August 1911) was a British Army soldier and an Irish recipient of the Victoria Cross, the highest award for gallantry in the face of the enemy that can be awarded to British and Commonwealth forces.

Early life
Stagpoole was born in Killunan, County Galway in 1838.

Victoria Cross
Stagpoole was about 25 years old, and a Drummer in the 57th Regiment of Foot (later The Middlesex Regiment (Duke of Cambridge's Own), during the Second Taranaki War campaign of the New Zealand Wars when the following deed took place on 2 October 1863 at Allan's Hill near Poutoko in Taranaki, for which he and Ensign John Thornton Down were awarded the VC, and a separate incident at Kaipakopako for which he was awarded the Distinguished Conduct Medal:

Further information
He died in Ware, Hertfordshire on 1 August 1911.

His Victoria Cross is displayed at the Princess of Wales's Royal Regiment and Queen's Regiment RHQ, Howe Barracks, Canterbury, Kent

References

External links
Dudley Stagpoole, his brothers and descendants
Location of grave and VC medal (N.W. London)

1838 births
1911 deaths
19th-century Irish people
Irish soldiers in the British Army
Middlesex Regiment soldiers
Irish recipients of the Victoria Cross
Recipients of the Distinguished Conduct Medal
People from County Galway
British military personnel of the New Zealand Wars
New Zealand Wars recipients of the Victoria Cross
British Army personnel of the Crimean War
British military musicians
British Army recipients of the Victoria Cross